Unionville GO Station is a train and bus station in the GO Transit network located in Markham, Ontario, Canada. It is a stop on the Stouffville line.  The station is also served by Highway 407 East Express buses, which run westbound to Highway 407 station, northbound to Mount Joy GO Station, and eastbound to the Oshawa GO station.

By late May 2022, the station had acquired a second track, a turnaround track and an island platform to support future all-day, two-way service on the Stouffville line. In future, GO trains will run every 10 minutes to Unionville and every 30 minutes to Mount Joy GO Station.

History

Old Unionville Station

The original Unionville Station was opened in 1871 by the Toronto and Nipissing Railway. The railway line and station were acquired in succession by the Midland Railway of Canada in 1882, the Grand Trunk Railway in 1884 and Canadian National Railway in 1923. Canadian National served the station until 1978; GO Transit used the station from 1982 to 1991. GO train service ended at the station on Friday May 3, 1991, and service began at the current GO station the following Monday, May 6.

The old station building has been restored and is now used as a community centre. Like Markham GO Station, this station features classic Canadian Railway Style with elements of Vernacular Carpenter Gothic architecture of the 19th Century.  It is located on Station Lane, near Main Street Unionville. While a platform exists it is fenced off from the rail line to indicate it is not an operational station.

Current station
The current station was built in 1991 to replace the old Unionville Station. The newer station was renovated and re-opened in April 2005 and accessed by a service road from Kennedy Road north of Highway 407.

By the end of May 2022, Metrolinx had completed a number of station improvements as part of GO Expansion to support future all-day, two-way service on the Stouffville line. The improvements include:
 A second track, new platform and a turnaround track.
 A new island platform and a relocated east platform, both with canopies, shelters and a snow-melting system.
 New pedestrian tunnels and elevators.
 286 additional parking spots.
 Pedestrian walkways through the parking lot.
 New ramps from the parking lot to the platforms.
 More bicycle storage.

Connecting bus routes

GO Transit
 52 407 East (Oshawa–Highway 407 Bus Terminal)
 54 407 East (Markham–Highway 407 Bus Terminal) (weekdays only)
 71 Stouffville ("Train-bus" for Stouffville Line when trains do not operate)
 45B 407 East (Streetsville GO Station–Unionville GO Station)
 56A 407 Corrider (Oakville GO Station–Oshawa GO Station)

York Region Transit
 8 Kennedy
 42 Berczy (temporarily suspended)

VIVA routes 

 Viva Pink (temporarily suspended)
 Viva Green (temporarily suspended)
 Viva Purple

Viva service began on October 16, 2005, with buses stopping near Kennedy Road. Because the nearby Enterprise Drive was not finished when Viva services in the area began, this station served as a temporary station until November 19, 2005. During this time, both Viva Purple and Viva Green buses had to go on a detour on Highway 407 nearby. Viva Pink services were added on January 2, 2006.

Unionville Station is the eastern terminus of peak services on the Viva Pink services to Richmond Hill Centre and Finch station. Viva Pink, Viva Green, and Viva Purple usually serve Unionville Station. However, due to the COVID-19 pandemic, Viva Pink and Viva Green services were temporarily suspended.

References

External links

GO Transit railway stations
Railway stations in Markham, Ontario
Railway stations in Canada opened in 1991
Designated heritage railway stations in Ontario
1991 establishments in Ontario